Cetywayo and His White Neighbours, or Remarks on Recent Events in Zululand, Natal and the Transvaal is an 1882 non-fiction book by H. Rider Haggard, his first full-length published work. It was based on his time working in South Africa. The "Cetywayo" of the title is the Zulu king Cetshwayo kaMpande.

Background
Haggard had worked for six years in South Africa. He wrote the book at Norwood in 1881 while also studying for the Bar. He later said it "represented a great amount of labour. I was determined that it should be accurate, and to ensure this I purchased all the Blue-books dealing with the period of which I was treating."

He sent it off to various publishers and only received one offer – from Trubner and Company, who offered to produce 750 copies if Haggard gave them fifty pounds. The author did so.

Reception
The book had some good reviews and Haggard received letters of praise from such figures as Lord Carnarvon and Randolph Churchill but by 1883 had only sold 154 copies, meaning he lost his fifty pounds. A revised edition was published in 1888. Although by this time Haggard had become a popular novelist, the later edition was not popular either. Haggard claims however that an 1899 edition sold 30,000 copies.

References

External links
Complete book at Project Gutenberg
Complete book at Internet Archive

1882 non-fiction books
Works by H. Rider Haggard
Books about South Africa